Dzze (Ꚉ ꚉ; italics: Ꚉ ꚉ) is a letter of the old Abkhaz, Ossetic and Komi alphabets. It represents the voiced alveolo-palatal affricate (d͡ʑ).

In Ossetian, it was later replaced with digraph dz (currently дз).

It is used to distinguish the affricate  from the sequence d-z in some phonetic dictionaries.

Computing codes

See also 
Cyrillic characters in Unicode

References

Cyrillic letters